Massimo Bottura (born 30 September 1962) is an Italian restaurateur and the chef patron of Osteria Francescana, a three-Michelin-star restaurant based in Modena, Italy ranked No.1 on The World's 50 Best Restaurants list twice and currently part of the Best of the Best list.

Early career and life
Massimo Bottura was born and raised in Modena, Italy. He developed an interest in cooking from a young age while watching his mother, grandmother and aunt in the kitchen, preparing meals for the family.

After secondary school, he enrolled in law school at the University of Modena and Reggio Emilia, but in 1986 he interrupted his studies and chose to join the family business, where he initially worked as a wholesaler of petroleum products.

Life as a chef 
The same year he stopped working for his family and took over Trattoria del Campazzo, near Nonantola, where he deepened his knowledge of Emilian cuisine with the support of rezdora Lidia Cristoni. He later deepened his knowledge of classical French cuisine thanks to lessons given by Georges Coigny, consolidating his culinary foundations on a combination of regional Italian cuisine and classical French training.

In 1993 he moved to New York and worked in an Italian café. There he met Lara Gilmore, his future wife. After nine months, he returned to Modena and in 1994 began an internship of several months with Alain Ducasse at his restaurant "Le Louis XV" in Monte Carlo. In 1995 he returned to Modena and took over a traditional trattoria in the heart of the city, Osteria Francescana, officially opened since 19 March of the same year.

In 2000 Catalan chef Ferran Adrià invited Bottura to the kitchen of his restaurant "El Bulli" in Spain, where the Modenese chef learned the basics of molecular cuisine.

In 2002 Bottura received his first Michelin star, followed by the second in 2006 and the third in 2012.

Osteria Francescana 

On 19 March 1995 Bottura opened Osteria Francescana in the historic center of Modena. Here the chef presents his cuisine which balances innovation and tradition, with dishes that explore the deep roots of Italian cuisine by referencing history, art, and philosophy.

Today, Osteria Francescana is a three Michelin starred restaurant held since 2012, and ranked first on The World's 50 Best Restaurants list twice, in 2016 and 2018.

Since 2019, it has been part of the Best of the Best list, the category that includes all restaurants that ranked first in The World's 50 Best Restaurants and can no longer be voted in new editions of the list.

The restaurant has also received top ratings from L'Espresso, Gambero Rosso and the Touring Club guides.

In 2020, Osteria Francescana was awarded a Michelin Green Star in recognition of the chef's ongoing commitment against food waste and in favor of a more equitable and sustainable food system.

The other restaurants and projects 
In 2011, also in Modena, he took over the restaurant "Franceschetta58." While Osteria Francescana offers customers an iconoclastic take on Italian cuisine, Franceschetta58, Bottura's second restaurant, is a contemporary bistro serving local ingredients in a convivial atmosphere.

In 2013, he participated in the Year of Italian Culture in the United States and was the main character in an episode of the fifth season of the program The Witness hosted by Pif.

He is one of the ten directors of the Basque Culinary Center training center.

In 2015 he starred in the first episode of the Netflix documentary "Chef's Table."

In 2018 he opened Gucci Osteria da Massimo Bottura in Florence, the cradle of the Renaissance, with the desire to honor the union of local traditions and multicultural encounters. In fact, the restaurant is awarded its first Michelin Star in 2019. In early 2020, Gucci Osteria da Massimo Bottura also opened its doors to the public in Beverly Hills, Los Angeles, and obtain its first Michel star the following year. More recently Gucci Osteria opened in Tokyo, in August 2021, and in Seoul, in February 2022, with great success as well. In November 2022, Gucci Osteria Tokyo was also awarded its first Michelin Star.

In February 2019, Bottura worked in collaboration with W Hotels to open Torno Subito at W Dubai – The Palm on Palm Jumeirah. In May of the same year, he opened a new hospitality concept with his wife Lara Gilmore: Casa Maria Luigia, a country inn located on an 18th-century property in the Modenese countryside.

In June 2020, along with other chefs, architects, Nobel laureates in economics and leaders of international organizations, he signed the call for a purple economy ("For a cultural renaissance of the economy") published in Corriere della Sera, El País and Le Monde.

In September of the same year, Massimo Bottura was appointed Goodwill Ambassador for the United Nations Environment Programme (UNEP), on the occasion of the inauguration of the International Day of Awareness of Food Loss and Waste.

In June 2021, Massimo Bottura reopened the Cavallino restaurant in collaboration with Ferrari and architect and designer India Mahdavi, with the desire to give new light to this iconic place that represents the history of Ferrari and the culinary traditions of Emilia Romagna.

In addition to the restaurant business, since 1995 Massimo Bottura has dedicated himself to the production of PGI Balsamic Vinegar from Modena and extra virgin olive oil with his Villa Manodori line of condiments, the result of his constant quest for the best quality ingredients.

In 2022 he received the Italy USA Foundation's America Award at the Chamber of Deputies.

Food for Soul 
In 2015, in conjunction with the EXPO Milan, Bottura carried out a project in collaboration with Caritas Ambrosiana: the Refettorio Ambrosiano; this project, aimed at welcoming people in need, with the help of more than fifty chefs allowed the recovery of about fifteen tons of food surplus resulting from the EXPO. The Refettorio Ambrosiano project is active to this day and the model has been replicated in different parts of the world.

In Brazil, the project was inaugurated during the 2016 Summer Olympic Games in collaboration with chef David Hertz: the Refettorio Gastromotiva.

As a consequence of these projects, in 2016 Bottura and his wife founded Food for Soul, a nonprofit association that, through the daily work of Refettorios around the world, aims at contrasting food waste and social isolation through the power of beauty, the quality of ideas and the value of hospitality.

In order to raise awareness on these issues, in 2017 Massimo Bottura published the book "Bread is Gold" with Phaidon Press – "Il Pane è Oro," published in Italian by Ippocampo. The book collects recipes, ideas and experiences of the chefs who cooked at Refettorio Ambrosiano during its the first six months, to invite readers to see the ingredients in pantries and home refrigerators with different eyes.

Since then, Food for Soul has developed several projects around the world in collaboration with local partners. By building community spaces where people are invited to connect around a meal, Food for Soul aims to demonstrate the value and potential of people, places, and food and encourage the community served to support social change.

In 2020, during the COVID-19 pandemic, Food for Soul Refettorios continued to work and support those most in need; not only that, a fundraiser was also launched through which more than 35 tons of surplus food were recovered in a single month and more than 100,000 meals were delivered to people in vulnerable situations and frontline health workers.

After, Refettorio Ambrosiano and Refettorio Gastromotiva, Food for Soul opened Refettorio Felix in London, Refettorio Paris, Refettorio Antoniano in Bologna and Refettorio Made in Cloister in Naples. Despite the situation due to the pandemic in 2020 and 2021, Food for Soul has continued working on new projects to support local communities and contrast food waste and social isolation.

Refettorios Mérida and Lima have opened there doors in 2020, along with Refettorio Harlem in New York and Refettorio San Francisco in California, while in 2021 it was the turn of Refettorio OzHarvest Refectory in Sydney and Refettorio Geneva in Switzerland, while other projects are currently in the works.

Kitchen quarantine 
In March 2020, after the temporary closure of Osteria Francescana due to the first covid-19 lockdown, Massimo and his daughter Alexa started Kitchen Quarantine, a series of Instagram lives conducted by the Bottura family every night during quarantine. The project was created to interact with families around the world, cook together and exchange ideas on how to reduce household food waste; an innovative way to bring an extra smile during a particularly difficult time for communities around the world. The 24th annual Webby Awards honored Massimo Bottura with a 2020 Webby Special Achievement Award as Chef of the Year for his the Kitchen Quarantine series, showcasing his family meals to fans around the world.

Books 
Bottura has written five books:

Aceto Balsamico (2005) Autoritratti in Cucina 
Parmigiano Reggiano (2006), PRO
Attraverso tradizione e innovazione (2006)
Never Trust a Skinny Italian Chef (2014) Phaidon Press 
Bread is Gold (2017) Phaidon Press

References

Prizes and awards 

 Osteria Francescana Three Michelin Stars (2012 – confirmed to date)
 Gucci Osteria Firenze one Michelin Star (2019 – confirmed to date)
 Gucci Osteria Los Angeles One Michelin Star (2021 – confirmed to date)
 Torno Subito Dubai One Michelin Star (2022)
 Gucci Osteria Tokyo One Michelin Star (2022)

2002

 Guida Michelin, one Michelin star
 Guida del Gambero Rosso, Premio Miglior Chef emergente

2004

 Guida dell'ESPRESSO, Performance dell'Anno

2005

 Lo Mejor de La Gastronomia, Premio Internacional
 Guida dell'ESPRESSO, Pranzo dell'Anno
 Guida Veronelli, Tre Stelle

2006

 Guida MICHELIN, Due Stelle Michelin
 Golosaria, Ristorante Creativo dell'Anno

2007

 Identità Golose, Miglior Chef creativo
 Guida del Gambero Rosso, Tre Forchette
 Guida dell'ESPRESSO, Piatto dell'Anno: "Riso grigio... e nero"
 Guida dell'ESPRESSO, punteggio 19/20

2008

 Guida dell'ESPRESSO, Piatto dell'Anno: "Zuppa di lumache e spuma di aglio dolce"

2009

 Guida dell'ESPRESSO, punteggio 19,5/20
 Guida del Gambero Rosso, Piatto dell'Anno: "Omaggio a Thelonious Monk"
 The World's 50 Best Restaurants, 13th Best Restaurant in the World
 The World's 50 Best Restaurants, Highest New Entry
 Istituto Valorizzazione Salumi Italiani, "Personaggio di Gusto"

2010

 Guida dell'ESPRESSO, punteggio 19,75/20
 The World's 50 Best Restaurants, 6th Best Restaurant in the World
 The World's 50 Best Restaurants, Best Italian Restaurant

2011

 Guida dell'ESPRESSO, Punteggio 19,75 (Miglior Ristorante d'Italia)
 Grand Prix de l'Art de la Cuisine, Chef dell'Anno
 The World's 50 Best Restaurants, 4th Best Restaurant in the World
 The World's 50 Best Restaurants, Chef's Choice Award
 Lo Mejor de la Gastronomia, El Restaurante del Dia 9,25

2012

 Guida del Gambero Rosso, Tre Forchette con punteggio 95/100 (Miglior Ristorante d'Italia)
 Guida dell'ESPRESSO, Punteggio 19,75/20 (Miglior Ristorante d'Italia)
 Guida MICHELIN, Tre Stelle Michelin
 Guida Touring, punteggio 93 (Miglior Ristorante d'Italia)
 The World's 50 Best Restaurants, 5th Best Restaurant in the World

2013

 Guida del Gambero Rosso, Tre Forchette con punteggio 95/100 (Miglior Ristorante d'Italia)
 Guida dell'ESPRESSO, Punteggio 19,75/20 (Miglior Ristorante d'Italia)
 The World's 50 Best Restaurants, 3rd Best Restaurant in the World

2014

 The World's 50 Best Restaurants, 3rd Best Restaurant in the World

2015

 The World's 50 Best Restaurants, 2nd Best Restaurant in the World
 Guida dell'ESPRESSO, Punteggio 20/20 (Miglior Ristorante d'Italia)
 Guida del Gambero Rosso, Tre Forchette con punteggio 95/100 (Miglior Ristorante d'Italia)

2016

 The World's 50 Best Restaurants, 1st Best Restaurant in the World

2017

 The World's 50 Best Restaurants, 2nd Best Restaurant in the World
 Premio nazionale Toson d'oro di Vespasiano Gonzaga

2018

 The World's 50 Best Restaurants, 1st Best Restaurant in the World
 Massimo Bottura riceve la Medaglia d'Oro di Benemerenza Civica dal Comune di Milano

2020

 Osteria Francescana riceve la Stella Verde Michelin
 Massimo Bottura riceve il riconoscimento Premiolino-BMW SpecialMente
 Food for Soul riceve il riconoscimento Compasso d'Oro

1962 births
Living people
Italian chefs
Italian restaurateurs
Italian cookbook writers
Businesspeople from Modena